The Best of Billy "Crash" Craddock is a greatest hits collection by country singer Billy "Crash" Craddock. It was released in 1982 on MCA Records. It consisted of two vinyl records.

Track listing

Record 1
Rub It In
Broken Down in Tiny Pieces
You Better Move On
The First Time
Sweet Magnolia Blossom
Easy As Pie
Still Thinkin' 'bout You
Ain't Nothin' Shakin'
Don't Be Angry
Slippin' And Slidin'

Record 2
Knock Three Times
Dream Lover
I'm Gonna Knock On Your Door
Walk Softly
I Love The Blues and the Boogie
Ruby Baby
A Tear Fell
'Till The Water Stops Runnin'
Afraid I'll Want To Love Her One More Time
You Rubbed It in All Wrong

1982 greatest hits albums
Billy "Crash" Craddock compilation albums